I Gotcha may refer to:

 "I Gotcha" (Joe Tex song), 1972
 "I Gotcha" (Lupe Fiasco song), 2006

See also
I Got You (disambiguation)
Gotcha (disambiguation)